Jason Robert Dodd (born 2 November 1970) is an English football coach and former professional footballer.

As a player, he was a full-back who notably spent sixteen-years playing for Southampton where the majority of those came in the Premier League. He made just shy of 400 league appearances during his stay before departing in 2005. He also played in the Football League for Plymouth Argyle and Brighton & Hove Albion, as well as non-league sides Bath City and Eastleigh. He was capped eight times at England U21 level.

Following retirement, he became manager of Eastleigh but left the club in 2007, returning to Southampton as a first team coach where he briefly managed the Saints on a caretaker basis in 2008. He then joined the coaching staff at Aldershot Town where he once more served as first team manager on a temporary basis before returning to Southampton on a third occasion as their youth academy director. In 2014 he was dismissed and later had a spell with Gosport Borough as assistant coach.

Playing career
Dodd was born in Bath, Somerset and attended the Beechen Cliff School. He joined Southampton from Bath City in 1989 for a fee of £15,000.

In December 2003, Dodd was initially credited with scoring a goal directly from a corner against Saints' rivals Portsmouth, but this was subsequently listed as an own goal by defender Sebastien Schemmel.

He was due to retire at the end of the 2004–05 season, during which he spent time on loan at Plymouth Argyle; however, after his contract expired with Southampton he left to join Brighton & Hove Albion. He made only seven appearances for Brighton during his year at the club due to injury.

In July 2006 he joined Conference South team Eastleigh on a free transfer, to play alongside former Southampton colleague, Francis Benali. A recurrence of his ankle injury prevented him playing after the first three games of the 2006–07 season, and he retired from playing in November 2006 and was appointed head coach of Eastleigh.

Coaching and managerial career
The following month he replaced Paul Doswell, who had become director of football, as Eastleigh's manager, but resigned in July 2007 to be replaced by David Hughes.

Dodd returned to Southampton as first team coach under manager George Burley in the summer of 2007, replacing Glynn Snodin. When Burley left in January 2008, Dodd became joint caretaker manager of Southampton, alongside John Gorman. However, on 23 June, Dodd was released by the club.

On 14 October 2009 he became the caretaker manager of Aldershot Town along with his former Southampton teammate Paul Williams after the previous manager, Gary Waddock, moved to Wycombe Wanderers.

On 4 November 2009, Dodd rejoined Southampton as director/chief coach of the club's youth academy to oversee the development of the next generation to come through St Mary's, but was dismissed from the role on 20 May 2014, along with his assistant Paul Williams. Dodd helped bring through a number of players into the first team squad including Luke Shaw, Calum Chambers and James Ward-Prowse.

In late 2014 Jason Dodd was back in football when he joined Gosport Borough as assistant coach. Dodd left after just over a year at the club.

Dodd is currently a member of the Physical Education department at independent school Winchester College.

Career statistics

Honours
Southampton
2003 FA Cup runners-up medal (Awarded by club for contributions en route to final)

References

External links

BBC stats 

1970 births
Living people
Sportspeople from Bath, Somerset
People educated at Beechen Cliff School
English people of Welsh descent
English footballers
England under-21 international footballers
Association football fullbacks
Brighton & Hove Albion F.C. players
Bath City F.C. players
Southampton F.C. players
Plymouth Argyle F.C. players
Eastleigh F.C. players
Premier League players
English Football League players
English football managers
Southampton F.C. managers
Aldershot Town F.C. managers
Eastleigh F.C. managers
Southampton F.C. non-playing staff